FRAXD or FRAXD gene is a gene symbol for fragile site, aphidicolin type, common, fra(X)(q27.2) D. The locus of the gene is located on fragile site of the q arm of chromosome X at position 27.2. It is used for gene testing in Homo sapiens (Human beings).

References 

Genes on human chromosome X
Proteins